Bamff House is the home of the Ramsays of Bamff, and is located within a  estate in Perthshire, Scotland.  Bamff House began as a fortified tower in the late 16th Century and was added to and altered in almost every century since then.

Bamff has been the home of several European beavers since 2002. The beaver became extinct in Scotland about four hundred and fifty years ago, but some animals have been present at  Bamff since a demonstration project was established in 2002. They inhabit a  area of woodland and wetland.

The Ramsays held the lands at Bamff from 1232, Nessus de Ramsay having been physician to Alexander II; his descendant, Alexander Ramsay was physician to both James VI and Charles I. It was his son, Gilbert who was made baronet in 1666 in recognition of his son, James's, bravery at the Battle of Rullion Green.  The current owners are Paul and Louise Ramsay.

Notable former resident owners

Sir James Henry Ramsay
Lady Hope Anita Jane Ramsay

References

External links
Bamff House website

Buildings and structures in Perth and Kinross